is a train station in Abira, Yūfutsu District, Hokkaidō, Japan.

Lines
Abira Station is served by the Muroran Main Line.

Station layout
The station has two ground-level opposed side platforms serving two tracks. Kitaca is not available. The station is unattended.

Adjacent stations

References

Railway stations in Hokkaido Prefecture
Railway stations in Japan opened in 1902